Wheels of Fire (Also known as "Vindicator" and "Desert Warrior" ) is a 1985 American film directed by Cirio H. Santiago.

Plot
In a post-apocalyptic future, the only semblance of order is an organized militia called "The Ownership" which seeks to peacefully convert scattered settlements to stable governments loyal to them, Trace is a wanderer who once worked for The Ownership, who is joined by his sister Arlie and her boyfriend, Bo; having saved them from a confrontation with a local gang.
Trace, Arlie and Bo soon encounter a band led by a man called "Scourge" and split up, Trace defeats the bandits following him, but Bo and Arlie are captured by Scourge's men. Bo is allowed to join the bandits, Arlie is taken by Scourge to be his sex slave.  Back on the road, Trace saves a Mercenary called 'Stinger' from Scourge's men and the two join forces and continue on.  Stinger and Trace find a group of 'Sand People' and rescue a psychic captive called 'Spike' who also joins them.

Stinger, Spike, and Trace leave together and find an Ownership fuel convoy that was attacked.  They return the sole survivor to his community of 'True believers', Trace leave Stinger and Spike with the True Believers and continues on to find his sister.  Scourge's men attack and destroy the True Believer camp, and when Trace returns he finds Stinger and the Ownership forces plotting a retaliatory strike. Trace notices his sisters locket around the neck of one of Scourge's dead men, In a rage, Trace ignores Stinger's requests for him to wait for the Ownership forces and a joint strike and goes alone.

Trace goes to Scourge's fortress and finds Arlie, while escaping Trace realizes that the Ownership is advancing into a trap set by Scourge.  Arlie dies while disarming the trap before it destroys the Ownership forces. Outnumbered, Scourge runs away but Trace catches up with him and kills him with Arlie's car. Stinger leads the Ownership troops in claiming the fortress and is killed by Scourge's second in command.

Production

Wheels of Fire was filmed in part in the island of Corregidor in the Philippines.

Roger Corman had money in the film. His former company, New World Pictures refused to distribute it, contributing to Corman suing New World.

Critical reception 
Variety called Wheels of Fire a 'Bargain-Basement rip-off of the Road Warrior series'

References

External links

1985 films
Philippine science fiction films
1980s science fiction action films
1985 independent films
1980s road movies
American post-apocalyptic films
American action adventure films
Films about automobiles
American chase films
Films set in deserts
American road movies
1980s science fiction adventure films
1980s English-language films
Films directed by Cirio H. Santiago
1980s American films